SAOL may stand for:

 Svenska Akademiens ordlista, the normative dictionary for Swedish
 Structured Audio Orchestra Language, a computer language for describing audio effects, part of MPEG-4
 Saol, a free monthly newspaper in the Irish language